Chysauster Ancient Village (meaning Sylvester's house) is a late Iron Age and Romano-British village of courtyard houses in Cornwall, United Kingdom, which is currently in the care of English Heritage. The village included eight to ten houses, each with its own internal courtyard. To the south east is the remains of a fogou, an underground structure of uncertain function.

Location
Chysauster lies in southwest Cornwall in the Penwith District. It is located about 5 km north of Penzance at 175 m above sea level. The site is open from March/April to early November, and it is in the care of English Heritage, who charge an admission fee. The iron-age hill fort of Castle An Dinas is just over 1 km to the east. Another similar Iron Age settlement is Carn Euny about 10 km to the southwest and comparisons can be made with the contemporary Atlantic Castro culture.

Settlement

Chysauster village is believed to have been inhabited from about 100 BC until the 3rd century AD; it was primarily agricultural and unfortified and probably occupied by members of the Dumnonii tribe. The village consists of the remains of around 10 courtyard houses, each around 30 metres in diameter. Eight of the houses form two distinct rows, and each house had an open central courtyard surrounded by a number of thatched rooms. The houses have a similar layout. The buildings are oriented on an east-west axis, with the entrance facing east. The walls survive to heights of up to 3 metres. A field system in the vicinity attests to the site's farming connections.

Chysauster has been excavated several times, including a dig by the antiquarian William Copeland Borlase in 1873. Reconstruction work has been carried out on several occasions.

Fogou
To the south of the settlement is an underground passage of a type known locally as fogou (from the permanently lenited form of mogow, Cornish for cave). Fogous can be found in other places in the UK and Ireland, and are known more generally as souterrains; their purpose is unclear. The fogou at Chysauster was originally recorded as running well over 16 metres in length but was blocked up in the late 20th century for safety reasons. It was recorded around 1847 by Henry Crozier who described it as a "voe or sepulchral chamber".

References

Further reading
 Cavendish, Richard: Prehistoric England (London, 1983)
 Christie, Patricia Maeve Lascelles: Chysauster Ancient Village, Cornwall (London, English Heritage, 1987)
 Reynolds, P. K. B., Chysauster, Cornwall, Great Britain. Ministry of Public Building and Works (London H.M.S.O., 1960)

External links

Chysauster Ancient Village information at English Heritage
  Teachers' resources for Chysauster Village: English Heritage
  Hazard information for risk assessment for group leaders: English Heritage

Buildings and structures in Cornwall
English Heritage sites in Cornwall
History of Cornwall
Prehistoric sites in Cornwall
Tourist attractions in Cornwall
Iron Age sites in Cornwall
Former populated places in Cornwall
Roman sites in England
Cornish courtyard houses
Fogous